A list of alumni of Magdalen College, one of the constituent colleges of the University of Oxford in England. Notable former students include politicians, lawyers, bishops, poets, and academics. The list is largely male as women were first admitted to study at Magdalen in 1979.

Politicians, civil servants and Parliamentarians

 Geoffrey Adams, British Diplomatic Service
 Montek Singh Ahluwalia, Indian economist and civil servant
 Francis Ashley, lawyer and MP between 1614 and 1625
 Sir Walter Bagot, 5th Baronet, 18th-century MP
 Lord Baker, politician, former MP
 Thomas Berkeley, MP
 Sir John Biggs-Davison, former Conservative MP
 Sir Trevor Bigham, barrister and  Assistant Commissioner of the London Metropolitan Police, 1914–1931
 Nicholas Boles, Conservative MP for Grantham and Stamford
 Sir Ian Bowater, Lord Mayor of London (1967–1970)
 Sir Ashley Bramall, Labour Party politician, MP for Bexley, 1946–1950
 George Brandis, Australian diplomat and former Attorney-General (2013–2017)
 Jock, Lord Bruce-Gardyne, Conservative politician
 Sir Julian Bullard,  diplomat, Foreign Office Minister and Pro-chancellor of Birmingham University
 Alex Chalk, Conservative MP for Cheltenham and Parliamentary Under-Secretary of State for Justice
 Tankerville Chamberlayne, landowner in Hampshire and a Member of Parliament for Southampton
 Wesley Clark, American Army general and politician
 Sir Cecil Clementi, British colonial administrator who served as Governor of Hong Kong, 1925–1930; Governor and Commander-in-Chief of the Straits Settlements, 1930–1934
 Robert Douglas Coe, diplomat and U.S. Ambassador to Denmark, 1953–1957
 Sir Douglas Dodds-Parker, member of the Special Operations Executive in the Second World War, and later a UK Conservative MP
 Francis Patrick Donovan, Australian diplomat and jurist
 Sir Erasmus Dryden, 1st Baronet, Member of Parliament for Banbury (1624)
 Gareth Evans, Australian international policymaker, former politician and current Chancellor of the Australian National University
 Jim Forbes, Australian politician
 Malcolm Fraser, former Australian Liberal Party politician; 22nd Prime Minister of Australia
 Sir Marrack Goulding, diplomat, Under-Secretary-General of the United Nations, Warden of St Antony's College (1997–2006)
 Dominic Grieve, Conservative politician and former Attorney General
 William Hague, Conservative politician and former Foreign Secretary
 John Hemming, Liberal Democrat politician and businessman
 Chris Huhne, Liberal Democrat politician
 Jeremy Hunt, Conservative politician and Chancellor of the Exchequer
 Lord Hutton, formerly John Hutton MP
 Harford Montgomery Hyde, barrister, politician (Ulster Unionist MP for Belfast North), author and biographer
 Christopher Jackson, politician, businessman, author (Conservative MEP for Kent East 1979–1994, Deputy Leader Conservative MEPs)
 Michael Jay, Baron Jay of Ewelme, former diplomat and Chairman of the House of Lords Appointments Commission
 Gladwyn Jebb, civil servant, diplomat and politician
 Keith Joseph, barrister and politician
 Francis Oswald Lindley, British diplomat
 Stephen Milligan, Conservative politician and journalist
 Randy Minchew, American politician and lawyer
 Audri Mukhopadhyay, Canadian diplomat
 George Osborne, Conservative MP for Tatton (2001–2017), former Chancellor of the Exchequer and newspaper editor
 John Redwood, Conservative MP for Wokingham
 Tim Renton, Baron Renton of Mount Harry, Conservative politician: Chief Whip, Minister of State and Arts Minister, 1984-1992
 William Rodgers, Baron Rodgers of Quarry Bank, one of the "Gang of Four" of senior British Labour Party politicians who defected to form the Social Democratic Party (SDP)
 Henry Sacheverell, clergyman and politician
 Duncan Sandys, politician
 Sir John Scarlett, Director General of the British Secret Intelligence Service (MI6), 2004–2009
 Arthur Snell, former British High Commissioner to The Republic of Trinidad and Tobago
 Siôn Simon, Labour politician and MP (2001–2010)
 Zev Sufott, British-born Israeli diplomat, Ambassador to the Netherlands, first Israeli Ambassador to China
 John Turner, lawyer and former politician; 17th Prime Minister of Canada

Peers and royalty
A number of Magdalen alumni have been associated with royal families around the world, or the peerage:

 King Edward VIII (attended when Prince of Wales; did not graduate)
 Wriothesley Russell, 2nd Duke of Bedford
 Wilfrid Ashley, 1st Baron Mount Temple, soldier and Conservative politician
 King Jigme Khesar Namgyel Wangchuck of Bhutan
 Robert Boothby, Baron Boothby, Conservative politician
 Al-Muhtadee Billah, Crown Prince of Brunei Darussalam
 Edward Knatchbull-Hugessen, 1st Baron Brabourne, Liberal politician in William Gladstone's government
 Edward Bridges, 1st Baron Bridges, civil servant and Chancellor of Reading University (1959–1969)
 George Cambridge, 2nd Marquess of Cambridge, great-great-grandson of King George III
 Frederic Thesiger, 1st Viscount Chelmsford, Governor of Queensland (1905–1909), Governor of New South Wales (1909–1913); Viceroy of India (1916–1921)
 John Hely-Hutchinson, 2nd Earl of Donoughmore, politician, peer and soldier
 Arthur Hill, 2nd Marquess of Downshire, peer and MP
 Thomas Fairfax, 5th Lord Fairfax of Cameron, 17th-century politician
 Patrick Neill, Baron Neill of Bladen, member of the House of Lords, Warden of All Souls College (1977–1995), Vice-Chancellor of Oxford University (1985–1989)
 Henry Pelham-Clinton-Hope, 9th Duke of Newcastle, peer and aviator
 Prince Tomohito of Mikasa, cousin of Emperor Akihito
 Yasuhito, Prince Chichibu, second son of Emperor Taishō
 Prince Christian Victor of Schleswig-Holstein, member of the British royal family
 Nicolas Browne-Wilkinson, Baron Browne-Wilkinson, former Senior Lord of Appeal in Ordinary in the United Kingdom; former Head of the Privy Council and Vice-Chancellor of the High Court
 Lord Frederick Windsor, great-grandson of King George V

Justice

 James Richard Atkin, lawyer and judge
 Charles Arnold-Baker, barrister, author and historian
 Michael Beloff, barrister and former President of Trinity College
 Jocelyn Benson, lawyer, Dean and author
 Stephen Breyer,  Associate Justice of the Supreme Court of the United States
 Michael Briggs, Lord Briggs of Westbourne, Justice of the Supreme Court of the United Kingdom
 Alan Brodrick, 1st Viscount Midleton, Irish lawyer and politician
 Sir Charles Caesar, Judge and Master of the Rolls
 Guido Calabresi, legal scholar and senior Judge of the U.S. Court of Appeal for the Second Circuit
 Simon Chesterman, Dean and Professor of Law at the National University of Singapore
 Alfred Denning, Baron Denning, lawyer and senior Law Lord
 Reginald Manningham-Buller, 1st Viscount Dilhorne, lawyer, politician, Lord Chancellor (1962—1964)
 John Doyle, jurist, Chief Justice of the Supreme Court of South Australia (1995—2012)
 James Edelman, Justice of the High Court of Australia
 Russ Feingold, US lawyer and politician
 Michael Fox, barrister and High Court judge
 Sir James Gobbo, jurist and 25th Governor of Victoria
 Edward Anthony Hawke, Common Serjeant of London and Recorder of London
 Patrick Keane, Justice of the High Court of Australia
 Henry Keith, Baron Keith of Kinkel GBE, PC, Senior Lord of Appeal in Ordinary, United Kingdom
 John Neely Kennedy Bachelor of Civil Law in 1979, United States Senator from Louisiana
 Harold Hongju Koh, Korean-American lawyer and legal scholar
 Neal Macrossan, lawyer, judge and Chief Justice of the Supreme Court of Queensland
 Dinah Rose, human rights barrister and current President of the College
 David Souter, former Associate Justice of the Supreme Court of the United States
 Jonathan Sumption, Lord Sumption, Justice of the Supreme Court of the United Kingdom
 Gerald Thesiger, High Court Judge

Clergy
Edward Barber, (Archdeacon of Chester) (1886–1914)
 Hugh Boulter, Archbishop of Armagh in the Church of Ireland 
 John Colet, churchman and educational pioneer
 Thomas Cooper, English bishop, lexicographer, theologian, and writer
 John Davenport, puritan clergyman and co-founder of the American colony of New Haven
 Alan Don, Chaplain & Secretary to the Archbishop of Canterbury (1931–1941), Chaplain to the Speaker of the House of Commons, 1936–1946; Dean of Westminster, 1946–1959
 David Edwards, Dean of Norwich, Provost of Southwark and a prolific author
 Accepted Frewen, priest and Archbishop of York, 1660–1664
 Bede Griffiths, monk and theologian
 Henry Hammond, 17th-century churchman
 Robert Hawker, Anglican vicar and scholar
 Charles Bousfield Huleatt, Anglican priest
 Basil Jellicoe, missioner to Canning Town
 Owen Oglethorpe, academic and Catholic Bishop, President of Magdalen College, Oxford (1536–1552 and 1553–1555), Vice-Chancellor of Oxford University (1551–1552)
 Robert Parker, clergyman and scholar
 Henry Phillpotts, Anglican Bishop of Exeter, 1830–1869
 Reginald Pole, Cardinal in the Church of Rome
 Jeremy Sheehy, Anglican priest and academic
 William Tyndale, English reformer, linguistic genius, theologian
 Timothy Ware, monk and Bishop of the Eastern Orthodox Church (alias Kallistos Ware)
 Thomas Wolsey, Cardinal in the Church of Rome

Academics

Economists 

 Caroline Hoxby, American economist

Philosophers

 Ronald Dworkin, legal philosopher
 James Frederick Ferrier, metaphysical writer
 Edward Goldsmith, writer, environmentalist and philosopher
 A. C. Grayling, philosopher
 Peter Heylin, ecclesiastic and author of theological works
 Benedikt Isserlin, former Reader and Head of the Department of Semitic Studies at the University of Leeds
 Larry Siedentop, political philosopher

Historians and linguists
 Donald Adamson, author and historian
 Richard J. C. Atkinson, historian and archaeologist
 Robert Blake, Baron Blake, historian and life peer
 John Rouse Bloxam, historian and Fellow of Magdalen College, Oxford
 Thomas Sherrer Ross Boase, art historian, President of Magdalen College (1947–1968) and Vice-Chancellor of Oxford University (1958–1960)
 Derek Brewer, author and scholar, Master of Emmanuel College, Cambridge (1977–1990)
 Lionel Harry Butler, academic and Principal of Royal Holloway College, University of London (1973–1981)
 William Camden, antiquarian and historian
 Sir Neil Chalmers, former Director of the Natural History Museum London and Warden of Wadham College, Oxford
 Richard Chandler, antiquary
 William Cleaver, churchman and academic, Principal of Brasenose College, Oxford (1785–1809)
 Prof Edward Byles Cowell, translator of Persian poetry and the first Professor of Sanskrit at Cambridge University
 Norman Davies, historian
 Arthur Geoffrey Dickens, academic and author, Pro-Vice-Chancellor of the University of Hull (1959–1962)
 George Edmundson, clergyman and academic historian
 James Fenton, poet, journalist and literary critic
 Niall Ferguson, historian
 Felipe Fernández-Armesto, historian and author
 Theophilus Gale, educationalist, nonconformist and theologian of dissent
 Bernard Gardiner, Warden of All Souls College, Oxford and Vice-Chancellor of Oxford University (1712–1715)
 N. H. Gibbs, Chichele Professor of the History of War of Oxford University (1953–1977)
 Edward Gibbon, historian and Member of Parliament
 Martin Gilbert, historian
 Richard Gombrich, scholar of Sanskrit, Pāli, and Buddhist Studies, currently Founder-President of the Oxford Centre for Buddhist Studies
 Giles Henderson, Master of Pembroke College, Oxford
 R. L. Holdsworth, educationalist, cricketer and Himalayan mountaineer
 Albert Hourani, historian
 Reginald Johnston, academic, diplomat and tutor to Puyi
 Professor Anthony King, psephologist and political commentator
 Robin Lane Fox, classicist and gardener
 Francis Leighton, academic and Warden of All Souls College, Oxford (1858–1881)
 David Marquand, academic and former Labour Party MP
 David Thomas Powell, genealogist and antiquarian 
 Hormuzd Rassam, native Assyriologist, British diplomat and traveller
 Adam Roberts, professor of international relations

Mathematicians and scientists
Nobel laureates are identified

Paul Attfield, chemist and materials scientist
 John D. Barrow, cosmologist, theoretical physicist, and mathematician
 James Bateman, horticulturist
 H. A. Berlin, neuroscientist
 Humphry Bowen, chemist and botanist
 Henry Clerke, academic and physician, President of Magdalen College, Oxford, 1672–1687
 Frank Close, particle physicist, Professor of Physics at the University of Oxford
 William Henry Corfield
 Charles Daubeny, chemist, botanist and geologist
 Sir Gavin de Beer, evolutionary embryologist, Director of the British Museum of Natural History and President of the Linnean Society of London
 Robin Dunbar, anthropologist and evolutionary psychologist, currently Professor of Evolutionary Psychology at Oxford
 John Eccles, Nobel laureate (1963, Medicine)
 Sir John Bretland Farmer, botanist; Professor of Botany at Imperial College London
 James Fisher, author, editor, broadcaster, naturalist
 Howard Walter Florey, Nobel laureate (1945, Medicine)
 Ben Goldacre, physician, academic and science writer
 Jeffrey Alan Gray, psychologist
 John M. Goldman, haematologist, oncologist and medical researcher; pioneer in bone-marrow transplantation for chronic myeloid leukaemia; founding Chairman of the charity Leuka
 Brian Greene, theoretical physicist and string theorist
 Frank Robinson Hartley, chemist, Vice Chancellor Cranfield University
 Geoffrey Herford, entomologist and civil servant
 Francis Charles Robert Jourdain, amateur ornithologist and oologist
Anthony James Leggett, physicist Nobel Laureate (2003, physics)
 Alfred Lodge, mathematician and President of the Mathematical Association
 Amory Lovins, American physicist, environmental scientist and writer
 Peter Medawar, Nobel laureate (1960, Medicine)
 Desmond Morris, zoologist, ethologist and surrealist painter
 Gareth A. Morris, chemist
 Sheffield Airey Neave, naturalist and entomologist
 Matt Ridley, scientist, journalist, popular author, member of the House of Lords
 Sir Alexander Carr-Saunders, biologist and sociologist and later Director of the London School of Economics (1937–1957)
 A. Michael Spence, Nobel laureate (2001, Economics)
 Jon Stallworthy, Professor Emeritus of English at the University of Oxford
 Thomas William Webb, astronomer

Sports people
 Mark Andrews, rower in the 1981 World Rowing Championships
 Harold Arkwright, cricketer
 Francis Barmby, cricketer
 Edgar Burgess, rower
 Charles Burnell, rower in the 1908 Summer Olympics
 John Carr, first-class cricketer
 Sir Christopher Chataway, former middle and long-distance runner, television news broadcaster, and Conservative politician
 Sir Collier Cudmore, lawyer, politician and Olympic rower who won the gold medal in the 1908 Summer Olympics
 Michael England, cricketer
 Philip Fleming, banker, rower, competed in the 1912 Summer Olympics
 Stanley Garton, rower, competed in the 1912 Summer Olympics
 Sir James Angus Gillan, Scottish rower and colonial service official; competed in the 1908 Summer Olympics and in the 1912 Summer Olympics
 Ewart Horsfall, rower (1912 Summer Olympics and 1920 Summer Olympics)
 Alister Kirby, rower at the 1912 Summer Olympics
 Sir Clement Courtenay Knollys, rower and Colonial Administrator and Governor
 David Laitt, cricketer
 Sir Henry Leveson Gower, England cricketer and Test Captain
 Alister Kirby, rower who competed in the 1912 Summer Olympics
 Duncan Mackinnon, rower in the 1908 Summer Olympics
 Gilchrist Maclagan, rower in the 1908 Summer Olympics
 Evelyn Montague, athlete and journalist; ran in the 1924 Paris Olympics, and is immortalized in the 1981 film Chariots of Fire
 Guy Nickalls, rower who competed in the 1908 Summer Olympics
 Guy Oliver Nickalls, son of Guy Nickalls,  rower who competed in the 1920 Summer Olympics and in the 1928 Summer Olympics
 Malcolm Nokes, schoolteacher, soldier, research scientist and Olympic athlete (hammer throw and discus throw)
 Tuppy Owen-Smith, sportsman who played Test cricket for South Africa and captained England at Rugby Union
 Henry Wells, judge and coxswain at the 1912 Summer Olympics
 Leslie Wormald, rower in the Leander-eight in the 1912 Summer Olympics

Artists and writers

 Donald Adamson, author and historian
 Julian Barnes, writer
 Neil Bartlett, author, theatre director
 Sir John Betjeman, poet, writer and broadcaster
 Christopher Derrick, author, reviewer, publisher's reader and lecturer
 Lord Alfred Douglas, author, poet and translator
 Fernanda Eberstadt, writer
 Duncan Fallowell, novelist, travel writer, memoirist
 John Florio,  linguist and lexicographer
 Alan Garner, novelist
 John Gerrard, Legacy Fellow at Magdalen and artist
 Alan Hollinghurst, novelist and poet
 Pico Iyer, essayist and writer
 Girish Karnad, Indian writer and actor
 Gavin Lambert,  screenwriter, novelist and biographer
 Andrew Lloyd Webber, Peer of the realm and music composer
 John Lyly, writer, poet, dramatist, playwright and politician
 Robert Macfarlane, travel writer
 Compton Mackenzie, writer of fiction, biography, histories, and memoir
 Andrew McNeillie, currently Literature Editor at Oxford University Press
 Dave Morris, author of gamebooks, novels and comics
 Douglas Murray, author, writer and commentator
 Stephen Potts, author
 Benjamin Schwarz, writer
 Andrew Sullivan, author, editor, political commentator and blogger
 Wilfred Thesiger, explorer and travel writer
 Lucy Wadham, writer
 Oscar Wilde, Irish writer and poet
 George Wither, poet, pamphleteer and satirist

Journalists
 Aravind Adiga, writer and journalist
 Swaminathan S. Anklesaria Aiyar, journalist and columnist
 Clive Crook, columnist for the Financial Times
 Matthew D'Ancona, journalist
 Geoffrey Dawson, editor of The Times (1912–1919 and 1923–1941)
 Bill Emmott, editor of The Economist (1993–2006)
 Ronan Farrow, investigative journalist
 Sagarika Ghose, journalist, news anchor and author
 Julia Hartley-Brewer, presenter of the weekday morning radio show on Talkradio
 Bevis Hillier, art historian, author and journalist
 Ian Hislop, editor Private Eye magazine and TV series Have I Got News for You team captain
 Paul Johnson, journalist, historian, speechwriter and author
 Robert Kee, broadcaster, journalist and writer
 Nicholas D. Kristof, journalist, author, op-ed columnist
 Donald McLachlan, Scottish journalist and author, founding editor of The Sunday Telegraph
 John Micklethwait, editor-in-chief of The Economist
 Peter Millar, journalist
 John Sergeant, journalist and TV personality
 Charles Spencer, 9th Earl Spencer, UK Peer, brother of Diana, Princess of Wales, journalist and broadcaster
 John Thornhill, deputy editor of the Financial Times
 George Will, columnist, journalist and author

Musicians
 Paul Agnew, operatic tenor
 John Mark Ainsley, lyric tenor
 Robin Blaze, countertenor
 Paul Brough, conductor and teacher
 Harry Christophers, conductor
 Vinicius de Moraes, poet, essayist, playwright and lyricist
 Anna Lapwood, organist, conductor and broadcaster
 David Lloyd-Jones, conductor
 Dudley Moore, actor, comedian, composer and musician
 Nicholas O'Neill, composer, arranger, organist and choral director
 Paul Sartin, oboist, violinist and singer with Bellowhead, and others
 James Whitbourn, composer and conductor

Broadcasters and entertainers

 Peter Brook, film and stage director
 Michael Denison, actor
 Freddie Grisewood, radio broadcaster
 Robert Hardy, actor
 Brian Inglis, journalist, historian and television presenter
 Terrence Malick, film director, screenwriter and producer
 Katie Mitchell, theatre director
 Wallace Shawn, actor
 Louis Theroux, broadcaster
 Simon Woods, actor

Business

 David Abraham, Channel Four CEO
 Sir Eric Berthoud, oil man and diplomat
 Raymond Bonham Carter, banker; father of Helena Bonham Carter
 Sir Rupert Clarke, 3rd Baronet, soldier, businessman and horse rider
 Sir Vernon Ellis, Chair of the British Council
 Darius Guppy, British-Iranian businessman
 Dido Harding, CEO of TalkTalk
 Luke Johnson, businessman and Financial Times columnist
 J. Paul Getty, Anglo-American industrialist
 Martha Lane Fox, Baroness Lane-Fox of Soho, co-founder of Lastminute.com and Peeress
 Prince Rupert Loewenstein, manager of the Rolling Stones
 Sir Humphrey Mackworth, industrialist and politician
 Clare Melford, former CEO of the International Business Leaders Forum
 Michael Montague, Baron Montague of Oxford, businessman and politician
 Pete Flint, founder of Trulia, Internet entrepreneur
 Sir Simon Robey, investment banker, co-founder of Robey Warshaw
 Laura Wade-Gery, Director of multi-channel e-commerce at Tesco and member of the British Government's Digital Advisory Board

Other people

 T. E. Lawrence (1888–1935), 'Lawrence of Arabia'
 Thomas Tudor Loveday (1875–1966), Principal of Southampton University College (1920–1922) and Vice-Chancellor of the University of Bristol (1922–1944)
 Simon Forman, Elizabethan astrologer, occultist and herbalist
 Robert Peverell Hichens, officer in the Royal Navy Volunteer Reserve
 Marc S. Ellenbogen, diplomat, philanthropist and President of the Prague Society for International Cooperation
 Vincent Cartwright Vickers, economist, humorist, artist, and Governor of the Bank of England.
 James Rebanks, author and sheep farmer.

Fictional characters
 P. G. Wodehouse attributes a Magdalen undergraduateship to his fictional literary character Bertie Wooster.
 Tibby, in E. M. Forster's Howards End, is also a Magdalen undergraduate.
 Bridey in Evelyn Waugh's Brideshead Revisited
 Nicholas Glozier in J.H. Fox's A Kentish Dream
 Bernard Woolley, the political adviser in Yes Minister and Yes Prime Minister.

References

 
Magdalen College